Earle Foxe (born Earl Aldrich Fox; December 25, 1891 – December 10, 1973) was an American actor.

Early years
Foxe was born in Oxford, Ohio, to Charles Aldrich Fox, originally of Flint, Michigan, and Eva May Herron. He was educated at Ohio State University, where he participated in theatrical productions.

Career 

Foxe left for New York City as a young man and became a stage actor, working for two years as the Garrick Stock Company's leading man. He performed on stage with Douglas Fairbanks before going into films. On Broadway, he performed in Dancing Around (1915), Come Seven (1920), and Princess Virtue (1921).

He appeared in some films in New York City and lived at the Lambs Club in the early 1920s at 130 West 44th Street in New York City but moved to California in 1922 and signed a contract with Fox Film Corporation.

Foxe became the first president of the Black-Foxe Military Institute, a military school for boys in Hollywood, in 1928 and served in that office until 1960.  He continued to regularly appear in movies until 1937, with two minor appearances thereafter.

Personal life and death 

Foxe married vaudeville star Maybelle Meeker, aka "Dainty Marie", on August 7, 1914, in Leavenworth, Kansas. The marriage effectively lasted about four months, but was not legally dissolved for a year.

Foxe later married Gladys Bennett (née Borum, but also known as the silent movie actress Gladys Tennyson) in 1925, a year after they both appeared in the film The Last Man on Earth, and legally adopted her son Chester Bennett, Jr.

Selected filmography

1910s

The Street Singer (1912, Short) .... Karl
The County Fair (1912, Short) .... John - Mary's Sweetheart
The Young Millionaire (1912, Short) .... John Curtis - Sarah's Father
The Tell-Tale Message (1912, Short) .... Robert Boardman - The Detective / James Ruthven - The Banker's Valet
A Battle of Wits (1912, Short) .... Frank Anderson
All for a Girl (1912, Short) .... Billy Joy, a Reporter (as Mr. Fox)
A Business Buccaneer (1912, Short) .... Hastings - Manager of the Rival Company
A Sawmill Hazard (1913, Short) .... Roland Hurton
A Desperate Chance (1913, Short) .... Tom Hoover - a Freight Conductor
The Cub Reporter's Temptation (1913, Short) .... Bud Collins - a Cub Reporter
The Game Warden (1913, Short) .... Heck Thompson - a Mountaineer
The Fire Coward (1913, Short) .... Jim Houston - a Revenue Officer
The Face at the Window (1913, Short) .... Harold - the Foreman's Nephew
The Pursuit of the Smugglers (1913, Short) .... James Peyton - an Internal Revenue Officer
The Scimitar of the Prophet (1913, Short) .... Harris - a Tourist
The Spender (1913, Short) .... Bobby Lang
His Wife's Child (1913, Short) .... Fox - the Dissolute
Unto the Third Generation (1913, Short)
The Green-Eyed Devil (1914, Short)
The Old Man (1914, Short)
The Floor Above (1914, Short) .... Bartlett
Home, Sweet Home (1914)
The Girl in the Shack (1914, Short) .... Jim - the Bandit
The Lover's Gift (1914, Short) .... James Dayton
The Swindlers (1914, Short) .... Roy Walton
The Escape (1914) .... Minor Role (uncredited)
The Rose Bush of Memories (1914, Short) .... Ogilvie - the Husband
To Be Called For (1914, Short) .... Otis Perkins
His Father's Rifle (1914, Short)
The Livid Flame (1914, Short) .... James McNair
Rosemary, That's for Remembrance (1914, Short) .... Harvey Greerson
Out of Petticoat Lane (1914, Short)
The Amateur Detective (1914, Short)
The Combination of the Safe (1914) .... The Diamond Thief
Celeste (1915, Short) - Harry Wallace - the Millionaire's Son
The Eternal Feminine (1915) .... Charles Philips
The Tiger Slayer (1915, Short) .... Frank Holden
The Lost Messenger (1915, Short) .... Charles Clancy
Locked In (1915, Short) .... Henry Blaisdell - Telegrapher
Diamonds Are Trumps (1916, Short) .... Tom Roach
The Trail of the Lonesome Pine (1916) .... Dave Tolliver
The Black Orchid (1916, Short) .... Lt. Jack Peters
Unto Those Who Sin (1916) .... Ashton
The Love Mask (1916) .... Silver Spurs
Alien Souls (1916) .... Aleck Lindsay
The Dream Girl (1916) .... Tom Merton
Public Opinion (1916) .... Dr. Henry Morgan
Ashes of Embers (1916) .... Richard Leigh
Panthea (1917) .... Gerald Mordaunt
Blind Man's Luck (1917) .... Boby Guerton
The Fatal Ring (1917) .... Nicholas Knox
Outwitted (1917) .... Billy Bond
The Honeymoon (1917) .... Richard Greer
The Studio Girl (1918) .... Frazer Ordway
From Two to Six (1918) .... Howard Skeele
Peck's Bad Girl (1918) .... Dick

1920s

The Black Panther's Cub (1921) .... Lord Maudsley
The Prodigal Judge (1922) .... Bruce Carrington
The Man She Brought Back (1922) .... John Ramsey
Vanity Fair (1923) .... Captain Dobbin
The French Doll (1923) .... Minor Role (uncredited)
Innocence (1923) .... Paul Atkins
Fashion Row (1923) .... James Morton
A Lady of Quality (1924) .... Sir John Ozen
The Fight (1924, Short) .... Reginald Van Bibber
The Hunt (1924, Short) .... Reginald Van Bibber
Oh, You Tony! (1924) .... Jim Overton
The Race (1924, Short) .... Reginald Van Bibber
The Last Man on Earth (1924) .... Elmer Smith
Paul Jones Jr. (1924, Short) .... Reginald Van Bibber
The Burglar (1924, Short) .... Reginald Van Bibber
The Guest of Honor (1925, Short) .... Reginald Van Bibber
A Spanish Romeo (1925, Short) .... Reginald Van Bibber
The Sky Jumper (1925, Short) .... Reginald Van Bibber
The Wrestler (1925, Short) .... Reginald Van Bibber
Wages for Wives (1925) .... Hughie Logan
A Parisian Knight (1925, Short) .... Reginald Van Bibber
The Feud (1926, Short) .... Reginald Van Bibber
The Reporter (1926, Short) .... Reginald Van Bibber
The Mad Racer (1926, Short) .... Reginald Van Bibber
A Trip to Chinatown (1926) .... Welland Strong
Rah! Rah! Heidelberg! (1926, Short) .... Reginald Van Bibber
The Swimming Instructor (1926, Short) .... Reginald Van Bibber
King Bozo (1926, Short) .... Reginald Van Bibber
The Tennis Wizard (1926, Short) .... Reginald Van Bibber
Motor Boat Demon (1927, Short) .... Reginald Van Bibber
Upstream (1927) .... Eric Brasingham
Society Architect (1927, Short) .... Reginald Van Bibber
Car Shy (1927, Short) .... Reginald Van Bibber
Not the Type (1927, Short) .... Reginald Van Bibber
Slaves of Beauty (1927) .... Paul Perry
A Hot Potato (1927, Short) .... Reginald Van Bibber
Ladies Must Dress (1927) .... George Ward Jr
Sailors' Wives (1928) .... Max Slater
Four Sons (1928) .... Maj. von Stomm
Hangman's House (1928) .... John D'Arcy
News Parade (1928) .... Ivan Vodkoff - Mysterious Stranger
None but the Brave (1928)
The River Pirate (1928) .... Shark
Blindfold (1928) .... Dr. Cornelius Simmons
Fugitives (1929) .... Al Barrow
New Year's Eve (1929) .... Barry Harmon
The Ghost Talks (1929) .... Heimie Heimrath
Thru Different Eyes (1929) .... Howard Thornton
Black Magic (1929) .... Hugh Darrell

1930s

Good Intentions (1930) .... 'Flash' Norton
Dance, Fools, Dance (1931) .... Wally Baxter (as Earl Foxe)
Transatlantic (1931) .... Handsome
The Spider (1931) .... John Carrington
Ladies of the Big House (1931) .... Kid Athens
The Wide Open Spaces (1931, Short) .... Townsman
Union Depot (1932) .... Detective Jim Parker, G-Man
The Expert (1932) .... Fred Minick
Strangers in Love (1932) .... J.C. Clark
The Midnight Patrol (1932) .... Judson
Destry Rides Again (1932) .... Brent
So Big! (1932) .... Pervus De Jong
They Never Come Back (1932) .... Jerry Filmore
The Engineer's Daughter (1932, Short) .... William Brawney
A Passport to Hell (1932) .... Purser
Two Lips and Juleps (1932, Short) .... Stanway Stone
Those We Love (1932) .... Bert Parker
The All-American (1932) .... Read
Scarlet Dawn (1932) .... Boris, a soldier (uncredited)
Men Are Such Fools (1932) .... Joe Darrow
Blondie Johnson (1933) .... Scannel
The Mind Reader (1933) .... Don Holman
A Bedtime Story (1933) .... Max de l'Enclos
Arizona to Broadway (1933) .... John Sandburg
The Big Shakedown (1934) .... Carey (uncredited)
Bedside (1934) .... Joe
Missouri Nightingale (1934) .... Harry Crandall
Little Man, What Now? (1934) .... Frenchman
You Belong to Me (1934) .... (uncredited)
Counsel on De Fence (1934, Short) .... Travers, Tony's Attorney
Love Time (1934) .... Sergeant
Bright Eyes (1934) .... Bond Man (uncredited)
The Informer (1935) .... British Officer (uncredited)
Brilliant Marriage (1936) .... Reporter
The Golden Arrow (1936) .... Alfred 'Pat' Parker
Mary of Scotland (1936) .... Earl of Kent
Fifteen Maiden Lane (1936) .... Society Crook (uncredited)
Crack-Up (1936) .... Operative #30
The Mighty Treve (1937) .... Judson (as Earle Fox)
We're on the Jury (1937) .... Mr. Thomas Jeffreys
Murder Goes to College (1937) .... Tom Barry
Dangerously Yours (1937) .... Eddie
Lady Behave! (1937) .... (uncredited)

1940s
Military Academy (1940) .... Maj. Dover
My Darling Clementine (1946) .... Gambler (uncredited) (final film role)

References

External links

 
 
 
 Earle Foxe at Virtual History

1891 births
1973 deaths
American male film actors
American male silent film actors
People from Oxford, Ohio
People from Greater Los Angeles
Male actors from Ohio
Ohio State University alumni
20th-century American male actors
American male stage actors